Gaku (written: 岳 or 学) is a masculine Japanese given name. Notable people with the name include:

, Japanese actor
, Japanese politician
, Japanese politician
, Japanese alpine skier
, Japanese aikidoka
, Japanese politician
, Japanese physicist
, Japanese actor
, Japanese actor
, Japanese manga artist
, Japanese footballer
, Japanese actor and singer
, Japanese footballer

See also
Gaku Station, a railway station in Yoshinogawa, Tokushima Prefecture, Japan
Gaku: Minna no Yama, a manga series

Japanese masculine given names